C. Louise Miller (born December 28, 1936) is an American politician and educator from Washington. Miller is a former member of the King County Council, third district, which includes North Bend, Snoqualmie, Issaquah, Sammamish, Fall City, Preston, Duvall, Redmond, Carnation, Skykomish, and part of Woodinville. Miller is a former Republican member of Washington House of Representatives.

References

1936 births
King County Councillors
Women state legislators in Washington (state)
Republican Party members of the Washington House of Representatives
San Jose State University alumni
Living people
People from Woodinville, Washington
21st-century American women